Fist of the North Star is a manga and anime series that was originally serialized from 1983 to 1988 in the Japanese Weekly Shonen Jump.

Fist of the North Star may also refer to:

 Fist of the North Star (1986 film), a Japanese animated film
 Fist of the North Star (1995 film), an American live-action film
 Fist of the North Star (1987 video game), side-scrolling action platform game for the Nintendo Entertainment System based on the manga of the same name.
 Fist of the North Star (2005 video game), a competitive fighting arcade game by Sega based on the manga series of the same name.
 Fist of the North Star: Ken's Rage, a 2010 3D beat 'em up video game, part of Tecmo Koei's Warriors series.
 Fist of the North Star: Lost Paradise, a 2018 action-adventure video game